Saurav Ghosal (born 10 August 1986, in Kolkata, West Bengal) is a professional squash player from India and reached a career-high world ranking of World No. 10 in April  2019. He completed his schooling at Lakshmipat Singhania Academy in Kolkata.

Career overview
In 2013, Saurav became the first Indian to reach the Quarter finals of the World Squash Championship at Manchester, England. In 2004, he became the first Indian ever to win the coveted British Junior Open Under-19 Squash title, defeating Adel El Said of Egypt in the final at Sheffield, England.

Saurav moved to Chennai after completing his school and was based at the ICL squash academy in Chennai and coached by Major (Rtd) Maniam and Cyrus Poncha in Chennai, India. Currently based in Leeds, he trains with Malcolm Willstrop at Pontefract Squash Club in West Yorkshire. Saurav is the current Indian national champion after he defeated Gaurav Nandrajog at the National Championships 2006 in New Delhi. As of May 2010, his PSA world rank is 27. In the top 100 in the world are two of his Indian Squash Colleagues Siddharth Suchde (80) and Harinder Pal Sandhu (90).

Saurav won the bronze medal at the Asian Games 2006 Doha and was awarded the Arjuna Award by the President of India in August 2007 thus becoming the first Squash player from the country to get the award.

Saurav started playing squash in his hometown of Kolkata, at the Kolkata Racquet Club. He did his schooling from Lakshmipat Singhania Academy, before moving to Chennai to join the ICL Squash Academy. Here he was coached by retired Major Maniam and Cyrus Poncha.

Ghosal has numerous firsts to his credit, the first Indian to be ranked junior World No one, the first to bag the junior National championship three years in a row and in December 2006, he won the country the first medal in squash in the Doha Asian Games. His first major title was the German Open (U-17) in May 2002 and he won the Dutch Open two months later.

In 2013, he became the first Indian squash player to reach the quarterfinals of the World Championship.
In 2014, he won the silver medal (individual singles) in the 17th Asian Games at Incheon. He was the first Indian squash player to do so. He lost in the final to Abdullah Al-Muzayen of Kuwait. He however led the Indian Squash team to its first ever Gold Medal at Incheon. In the final he bounced back from a game down to eke out a 6-11 11-7 11-6 12-14 11-9 win over former world no. 7, Ong Beng Hee in a gruelling 88-minute clash to give India a healthy 2-0 lead 

Ghosal also remains the first Indian player to claim a place in the world’s top 10 during the 2018-19 campaign.

Saurav Ghosal has been named as the Professional Squash Association’s (PSA) Men’s President as one of three new additions to the PSA’s Board of Directors, which were officially confirmed at the association’s annual AGM on Wednesday December 22, 2021.

In August 2022, Ghosal became the first Indian men's squash singles medalist at the Birmingham Commonwealth Games after he beat 2018 reigning champion James Willstrop of England in straight sets in the bronze medal playoff to take the bronze medal. He defeated Shamil Wakeel of Sri Lanka 11-4, 11-4, 11-6 in the second round, beat David Baillargeon of Canada 11-6, 11-2, 11-6 in the third round. In the quarter-final, he recovered from a defeat in the second set to see off Scotland’s Greg Lobbon 11-5, 8-11, 11-7, 11-3 before falling to New Zealand’s world no. 2 and eventual gold medallist Paul Coll 9-11, 4-11, 1-11 in the semi-final.

Personal life
Saurav married Diya Pallikal (sister of Dipika Pallikal Karthik) on 1 February 2017.

References

External links
 
 
 
 Newspaper articles on Saurav's PSA Otters win
 Saurav's interview in DNA
 Articles on Saurav on Cyrus Poncha's squash Blog
 Rediff interview
 "Asiad: Men’s squash team gets historic gold, women grab silver"

Indian male squash players
Recipients of the Arjuna Award
1986 births
Living people
Racket sportspeople from Kolkata
Asian Games medalists in squash
Squash players at the 2002 Asian Games
Squash players at the 2006 Asian Games
Squash players at the 2010 Asian Games
Squash players at the 2014 Asian Games
Squash players at the 2018 Asian Games
Asian Games gold medalists for India
Asian Games silver medalists for India
Asian Games bronze medalists for India
Medalists at the 2006 Asian Games
Medalists at the 2010 Asian Games
Medalists at the 2014 Asian Games
Medalists at the 2018 Asian Games
Squash players at the 2010 Commonwealth Games
Squash players at the 2018 Commonwealth Games
Squash players at the 2022 Commonwealth Games
Commonwealth Games silver medallists for India
Commonwealth Games bronze medallists for India
Commonwealth Games medallists in squash
South Asian Games bronze medalists for India
South Asian Games medalists in squash
Competitors at the 2009 World Games
Medallists at the 2018 Commonwealth Games
Medallists at the 2022 Commonwealth Games